1996–97 Ukrainian First League was the sixth season of the Ukrainian First League which was won by Metalurh Donetsk. The season started on August 4, 1996, and finished on June 20, 1997.

Promotion and relegation

Promoted teams
Three clubs promoted from the 1995–96 Ukrainian Second League.
Group A
 FC CSKA Kyiv – champion (returning after four seasons, previously in 1992 as SKA Kyiv)
Group B
 FC Metalurh Mariupol – champion (returning after four seasons, previously in 1992 as FC Azovets Mariupol)
 FC Metalurh Donetsk – promotion play-off (debut)

Relegated teams 
Three clubs were relegated from the 1995-96 Ukrainian Top League:
 SC Mykolaiv – 16th place (returning after two seasons, previously in 1994-95 as FC Evis Mykolaiv)
 FC Volyn Lutsk – 17th place (debut)
 FC Zorya Luhansk – 18th place (debut)

Renamed teams
 FC Zakarpattia Uzhhorod changed its name to FC Verkhovyna Uzhhorod before the season.
 FC CSKA Kyiv changed its name to FC CSKA-2 Kyiv before the season since becoming the farm team of the Borysfen-CSKA merger.
 FC Dnipro Cherkasy changed its name to FC Cherkasy during the winter break.

Teams
In 1996-97 season, the Ukrainian First League consists of the following teams:

Final table

Top scorers 
Statistics are taken from here.

See also
 Ukrainian Premier League 1996-97
 Ukrainian Second League 1996-97

References

Ukrainian First League seasons
2
Ukra